Richard Holt (1639–1710) was an English M.P. during the second half of the 17th century.

Holt was born in Portsmouth, the son of John Holt and Catherine née Bricket. He was educated at St John's College, Oxford.
In 1667 he married Margaret Whithed of West Tytherley: they had two daughters. 
He was appointed a Freeman of Portsmouth in 1658; of Lymington in 1677; and of Winchester in 1695. He was Commissioner of Wastes and Spoils for the New Forest from 1692.

References

Alumni of St John's College, Oxford
Politicians from Portsmouth
English MPs 1685–1687
English MPs 1689–1690
English MPs 1690–1695
English MPs 1695–1698
1639 births
1710 deaths